The Bing's Hollywood series was a Decca Records 15-album set by Bing Crosby of commercial recordings of songs used in his films from 1934 to 1956. Numbered in order from Decca DL4250 to DL4264, the LPs included "Easy to Remember", "Pennies from Heaven", "Pocket Full of Dreams", "East Side of Heaven", "The Road Begins", "Only Forever", "Holiday Inn", "Swinging on a Star", "Accentuate the Positive", "Blue Skies", "But Beautiful", "Sunshine Cake", "Cool of the Evening", "Zing a Little Zong" and "Anything Goes." In the UK, Brunswick Records issued the set with the numbers BING1 to BING 15.   In 1988 MCA Universal began reissuing "Bing's Hollywood" on compact disc, but poor sales abruptly halted the series following the release of "Holiday Inn", "Swinging on a Star" and "Blue Skies."

Details of all recordings have been taken from “A Bing Crosby Discography”.

Background
Variety gave the background in its issue of March 14, 1962.
“The timing was just right for Decca's massive release of Bing Crosby's Hollywood story. It fits perfectly into the programming pattern being adopted by so many radio stations, which in veering away from Top 40, are going in for marathon spinning of an individual personality. This Crosby release is tailor-made for them, in that it consists of 15 separate L.P's containing 189 songs from over 40 pictures.  No singer has come close to that mark and it's a record that's sure to stand for a long, long time.  For the average consumer the purchase of the complete series will obviously be hard on the pocket-book but each LP can be obtained separately (the suggested retail price is $3. 98) and each one is a gem. Not only did Crosby have a solid song-selling way right from the beginning, but he had top tune-smiths turning out material for him all the way...The series is virtually a recorded history of the filmusical genre and a credit to all concerned.

Albums
Recording dates follow song titles.

Easy to Remember
DL 4250. Tracks 1–3 from Here is My Heart, 4–7 from Mississippi, 8–12 from Two for Tonight, 13 from The Big Broadcast of 1936.

Pennies from Heaven
DL 4251. Tracks 1–3 from Anything Goes, tracks 4–6 and 11–12 from Rhythm on the Range, 7–10 from Pennies from Heaven.

Pocket Full of Dreams
DL 4252. Tracks 1–4 from Waikiki Wedding, tracks 5–8 from Double or Nothing and 9–12 from Sing You Sinners.

East Side of Heaven
DL 4253. Tracks 1–3 from Doctor Rhythm, tracks 4–8 from Paris Honeymoon and 9–12 from East Side of Heaven.

The Road Begins
DL 4254. Tracks 1–6 from The Star Maker, tracks 7, 10, 12–14 from If I Had My Way and 8–9 and 11 from Road to Singapore.

Only Forever
DL 4255. Tracks 1–4 from Rhythm on the River, tracks 5–8 from Road to Zanzibar and 9–12 from Birth of the Blues.

Holiday Inn
DL 4256. All tracks from Holiday Inn. Tracks 6 and 10 are solos by Fred Astaire.

Swinging on a Star
DL 4257. Tracks 1–4 from Road to Morocco, tracks 5 and 6 from Dixie and tracks 7–12 from Going My Way.

*Featuring a young Andy Williams

Accentuate the Positive
DL 4258. Tracks 1–4 from Here Come the Waves, tracks 5–8 from The Bells of St. Mary's and tracks 9–12 from Road to Utopia.

Blue Skies
DL 4259. Tracks 1–9 from Blue Skies, tracks 10–12 from Out of This World.

But Beautiful
DL 4260. Tracks 1–4 from Welcome Stranger, Tracks 5–8 from Road to Rio, tracks 9–12 from The Emperor Waltz and track 13 from Variety Girl.

Sunshine Cake
DL 4261. Tracks 1–4 from A Connecticut Yankee in King Arthur's Court, tracks 5–8 from Top o' the Morning, tracks 9–12 from Riding High.

Cool of the Evening
DL 4262. Tracks 1–6, 11–12 from Mr. Music, tracks 7–10 from Here Comes the Groom.

Zing a Little Zong
DL 4263. Tracks 1–6 from Just for You, tracks 7–12 from Road to Bali.

Anything Goes
DL 4264. Tracks 1–4 from Little Boy Lost, tracks 5–8 from The Country Girl tracks 9–12 from Anything Goes.

References 

Bing Crosby compilation albums
1962 compilation albums
Decca Records compilation albums